Sea purslane is a common name for several plants and may refer to:
 Halimione portulacoides, in family Amaranthaceae
 Honckenya peploides, in family Caryophyllaceae
 Sesuvium maritimum, in family Aizoaceae
 Sesuvium portulacastrum, in family Aizoaceae